Jane Mary Gough (born 4 September 1943) is an English former cricketer who played as a right-handed batter. She appeared in one One Day International for England, against Young England in the 1973 Women's Cricket World Cup. She scored 33 before being run out. She played domestic cricket for West of England.

References

External links
 
 

1943 births
Living people
Sportspeople from Twickenham
England women One Day International cricketers
West women cricketers